The Governor of Kursk Oblast is the head of government of Kursk Oblast, a federal subject of Russia.

The position was introduced in 1991 as Head of Administration of Kursk Oblast. The Governor is elected by direct popular vote for a term of five years and can hold the position for two consecutive terms.

List of officeholders

References 

Politics of Kursk Oblast
 
Kursk